Fellini: A Director's Notebook  is an Italian documentary for television directed by Federico Fellini shot in 16mm and first broadcast in the United States on NBC in 1969, on NBC Experiment in Television.

Plot 
Commissioned by NBC television producer Peter Goldfarb in 1968 to do an hour-long program on his work, Fellini filmed a "sort of semihumourous introduction"  to past and future plans: the recently abandoned project, The Voyage of G. Mastorna, and his latest work-in-progress, Fellini Satyricon.

Cast 
 Federico Fellini as himself
 Giulietta Masina as herself
 Marcello Mastroianni as himself
 Caterina Boratto as herself
 Marina Boratto as Script girl
 Genius the Medium as himself
 David Maumsell as the Archaeology professor

Home media 
This film is released in home media as part of Criterion Collection's Essential Fellini box.

References

Notes

Bibliography
 Fellini, Federico, and Damian Pettigrew (ed). I'm a Born Liar: A Fellini Lexicon. New York: Harry N. Abrams, 2003. 
 Alpert, Hollis (1988). Fellini: A Life. New York: Paragon House. 
 Kezich, Tullio (2006). Fellini: His Life and Work. New York: Faber and Faber.

External links 
 

1969 films
Films directed by Federico Fellini
Italian documentary films
Films scored by Nino Rota
1960s Italian-language films
Films with screenplays by Federico Fellini
1960s English-language films
1960s Italian films